"Idwk" (stylized as IDWK) is a song released by Canadian electronic music duo Dvbbs and American musician Blackbear. It was released as a single on June 1, 2018. It reached number 67 in Canada.

Music video
The music video was published on July 10, 2018, directed by Zac Facts.

Charts

Weekly charts

Year-end charts

Certifications

References

2018 singles
2018 songs
Blackbear (musician) songs
Songs written by Blackbear (musician)
Songs written by Mike Wise (record producer)